The English Football League Trophy, known for sponsorship purposes as the Papa Johns Trophy, is an annual English association football knockout competition open to all clubs in EFL League One and EFL League Two, with the addition of 16 under-21 teams from Premier League and EFL Championship clubs since the 2016–17 season. It is the 3rd most prestigious knockout competition in English football after the FA Cup and the EFL Cup.

Launched as the Associate Members' Cup during the 1983–84 season, the competition was renamed the Football League Trophy in 1992 after a reorganization following the formation of the Premier League and again as the current EFL Trophy in 2016 due to The Football League changing name to the English Football League. There had been an earlier but short-lived unrelated eponymous competition which changed name to the Football League Group Cup for one season in 1982–83.

Every season, the competition begins with two sets of draws in August, then runs 16 regional groups, each containing 4 teams and divided between northern and southern sections depending on the clubs' geographic locations. The top two from each group qualify for the knockout stages before the two winners meet in late March or early April in the final at Wembley Stadium. Some Midlands and East Anglian clubs fluctuate between the north and south each season for every draw. Other details have varied over the years, including in some years inviting clubs from the National League, and holding a round-robin group stage prior to moving into knockout rounds.
 
The current champions are Rotherham United, who beat Sutton United 4–2 in the 2022 final after extra time. The most successful club is Bristol City, who have lifted the trophy three times, in 1986, 2003 and 2015, and were finalists in 1987 and 2000.

History
A similar but distinct competition of the same name existed until it changed name to the Football League Group Cup, which took place for the final time in the 1982–83 season. Launched as the Associate Members' Cup in the 1983–84 season, it rebranded as the Football League Trophy in 1992, coinciding with a reorganization following the decision of the First Division clubs at the time to break away and form the Premier League. The Football League became responsible for the remaining three professional divisions. 

The competition rebranded again in 2016 to the current EFL Trophy due to The Football League rebranding as the English Football League. The first season under the new name saw 16 Category One academies of Premier League and EFL Championship clubs join the competition, a move which has been criticized for attempting to insert Premier League 'B' or academy U-21 teams into the English football pyramid.

Format

Current format
64 teams enter from Round One, including all 48 teams from League One and League Two, along with 16 category 1 Premier League and EFL Championship academy/under-21 sides. The competition now features 16 regional groups of four teams (with eight groups in each of Northern and Southern sections), with the top two from each group progressing to the knockout stages, the first two rounds of which remain regionalised before an open draw from the quarter-finals onwards.

During the group phase, if the scores are level at the end of the match, then penalties are taken immediately without recourse to extra time. The winning team is awarded 2 points and the losing team 1 point.

Similarly in the knock-out phase, except the final, if the scores are level at the end of the match the winner is decided by penalties. In the final, if the scores are equal after 90 minutes an extra 30 minutes are played and if still equal the winner is then decided by penalties.

Previous formats
On launch, the 48 eligible Third and Fourth Division clubs were split into North and South sections of 24 teams each. The first round had 12 knockout ties in each section, and the second had six. In each section the two second-round losers with the 'narrowest' defeats were reprieved, and joined the six other clubs in the regional quarter-finals.

A major change was introduced for the 1985–86 edition, with 8 three-team groups being set up in each of the two sections. Teams played one home and one away game and the group winners proceeded to the regional knockout stages. This format was tweaked the following season, with two teams qualifying from each group, resulting in an additional 'round of 16' knockout stage in each section.

For a number of seasons in the early to mid-1990s, the competition ran with only seven 3-team groups, two teams in each section receiving a bye into the knockout stages. This was owing to League reorganization and the demise of Aldershot and Maidstone United, which resulted in there being fewer than 48 teams in the 3rd and 4th levels.

The group phase was abolished for the 1996–97 edition; instead, 8 teams in each section received a bye to the second round, where they were joined by the 8 winners of the first-round ties.

For the 2000–01 season, 8 Conference Premier sides also played in the tournament, resulting in 12 ties in each of the north/south sections in the first round, with only four teams in each section gaining a bye into the second round. The number of Conference Premier entrants increased to 12 from 2002–03, resulting in 14 first-round ties, and two teams in each regional section gaining a bye into the second round.

Conference teams no longer participated from the 2006–07 tournament onward, and the format reverted to 8 first-round teams in each section, with 8 sides gaining byes to the second round.

Participants
The competition has always been contested by all teams at Levels Three and Four of the English football league system. Since the 2016–17 season, sixteen Category One academies have taken part in the competition. 

Between 2000–01 and 2005–06 the competition was also open to a certain number of Football Conference sides. These are listed by season below:
 2000–01: Chester City, Doncaster Rovers, Dover Athletic, Hereford United, Morecambe, Rushden & Diamonds, Scarborough, Yeovil Town
 2001–02: Barnet, Dagenham & Redbridge, Doncaster Rovers, Leigh RMI, Scarborough, Southport, Stevenage Borough, Yeovil Town
 2002–03: Chester City, Dagenham & Redbridge, Doncaster Rovers, Halifax Town, Hereford United, Leigh RMI, Morecambe, Scarborough, Southport, Stevenage Borough, Woking, Yeovil Town
 2003–04: Barnet, Chester City, Dagenham & Redbridge, Exeter City, Forest Green Rovers, Halifax Town, Hereford United, Morecambe, Scarborough, Shrewsbury Town, Stevenage Borough, Telford United
 2004–05: Accrington Stanley, Aldershot Town, Barnet, Carlisle United, Dagenham & Redbridge, Exeter City, Hereford United, Morecambe, Scarborough, Stevenage Borough, Woking, York City
 2005–06: Accrington Stanley, Aldershot Town, Cambridge United, Crawley Town, Dagenham & Redbridge, Exeter City, Halifax Town, Hereford United, Kidderminster Harriers, Morecambe, Stevenage Borough, Woking

Since the addition of the Category One academies in 2016–17, the following sides have competed in the competition:
 Current (2021–22): Arsenal (since 2018–19), Aston Villa (since 2019–20), Brighton & Hove Albion, Chelsea, Crystal Palace (since 2021–22), Everton (2016–17 to 2019–20 and since 2021–22), Leeds United (since 2021–22), Leicester City, Liverpool (since 2019–20), Manchester City (since 2017–18), Manchester United (since 2019–20), Newcastle United (since 2017–18), Southampton, Tottenham Hotspur (2017–18 to 2019–20 and since 2021–22), West Ham United, Wolverhampton Wanderers (2016–17 and since 2018–19)
 Former: Blackburn Rovers (2016–17), Derby County (2016–17), Fulham (2017–18 to 2020–21), Norwich City (2016–17, 2019–20 to 2020–21), Middlesbrough (2016–17 to 2018–19), Reading (2016–17 and 2017–18), Stoke City (2016–17 to 2018–19), Sunderland (2016–17 and 2017–18), Swansea City (2016–17 to 2018–19), West Bromwich Albion (2016–17 to 2018–19 and 2020–21)

Finals

Venue
The final of the EFL Trophy is held at the 90,000-seat Wembley Stadium in London, the English national football stadium. The first final in 1984 was due to be played at the then Wembley Stadium, but owing to damage caused to the pitch during the Horse of the Year Show, it was moved to Boothferry Park in Hull. From 2001 to 2007, during the rebuilding of the former Wembley, the Football League Trophy finals were played at the Millennium Stadium in Cardiff.

Winners

1983–84: AFC Bournemouth
1984–85: Wigan Athletic
1985–86: Bristol City
1986–87: Mansfield Town
1987–88: Wolverhampton Wanderers
1988–89: Bolton Wanderers
1989–90: Tranmere Rovers
1990–91: Birmingham City
1991–92: Stoke City
1992–93: Port Vale
1993–94: Swansea City
1994–95: Birmingham City (2)
1995–96: Rotherham United
1996–97: Carlisle United
1997–98: Grimsby Town
1998–99: Wigan Athletic (2)
1999–00: Stoke City (2)
2000–01: Port Vale (2)
2001–02: Blackpool
2002–03: Bristol City (2)
2003–04: Blackpool (2)
2004–05: Wrexham
2005–06: Swansea City (2)
2006–07: Doncaster Rovers
2007–08: Milton Keynes Dons
2008–09: Luton Town
2009–10: Southampton
2010–11: Carlisle United (2)
2011–12: Chesterfield
2012–13: Crewe Alexandra
2013–14: Peterborough United
2014–15: Bristol City (3)
2015–16: Barnsley
2016–17: Coventry City
2017–18: Lincoln City
2018–19: Portsmouth
2019–20: Salford City
2020–21: Sunderland
2021–22: Rotherham United (2) 

Source: NapIt (Only until 2010)

Records

Attendances
The overall record attendance for the final is 85,021, set at the Wembley Stadium in 2019 by Portsmouth and Sunderland. The record attendance for the final at the original Wembley Stadium was 80,841, set in the 1988 final between Wolverhampton Wanderers and Burnley. The record attendance for the final at the Millennium Stadium in Cardiff was 59,024, set in the 2007 final between Bristol Rovers and Doncaster Rovers.  The 2020 and 2021 finals were played with no fans present, but clubs raised money for charity by selling supporters virtual tickets.

 
The highest attendance for any game apart from the final came on 5 February 2013 for the Northern Area final, when Coventry City lost to Crewe Alexandra 3–0 at the Ricoh Arena in Coventry (they later won the away leg 2–0, going down 3–2 on aggregate), in front of a crowd of 31,054.

The lowest attendance in the history of the competition came during the 2018–19 season when just 202 attended a Middlesbrough academy team's 1–0 victory against Burton Albion in November 2018 at Burton's Pirelli Stadium. The low attendance can be attributed to a widespread boycott of the tournament by fans of the third and fourth tier clubs as a result of the competition format changes implemented in 2016–17. 'Category A' Academy teams, also known to fans as 'B teams', from the top level clubs in the Premier League and Championship were introduced to the competition, a change proven unpopular among football fans of the lower tier clubs.

Sponsors
1983–84: No sponsor
1984–85 to 1986–87: Freight Rover Trophy
1987–88 to 1988–89: Sherpa Van Trophy
1989–90 to 1991–92: Leyland DAF Cup
1992–93 to 1993–94: Autoglass Trophy
1994–95 to 1999–2000: Auto Windscreens Shield
2000–01 to 2006–07: LDV Vans Trophy
2007–08 to 2015–16: Johnstone's Paint Trophy
2016–17 to 2018–19: Checkatrade Trophy
2019–20: Leasing.com Trophy
2020–21 to present: Papa Johns Trophy

See also
Full Members' Cup
Football League Third Division North Cup
Football League Third Division South Cup

References

External links

 

EFL Trophy
Football cup competitions in England
English Football League
1984 establishments in England
Recurring sporting events established in 1984
1984 establishments in Wales